The Caplina River (Rio Caplina) is a river in southern Peru. It runs through the city Tacna, after which it gets dry due to filtration, evaporation and extractive use of the water.

References

Rivers of Peru
Rivers of Tacna Region